Sir Michael Aubrey Hamilton (5 July 1918 – 3 July 2000) was a British Conservative Party politician.

Hamilton was educated at Radley and University College, Oxford. He was a director of Royal Exchange Assurance and of Army & Navy Stores.

Hamilton was elected Member of Parliament (MP) for Wellingborough in 1959, which he lost in 1964.  He was then elected for Salisbury at a 1965 by-election, which he represented until he retired in 1983.  He was an opposition whip from 1961 to 1964, a senior one from the second year (a Lord Commissioner of the Treasury).  He was knighted in the 1983 Birthday Honours.  He died in Chichester, West Sussex two days before his 82nd birthday.

References
Times Guide to the House of Commons, 1966 and 1983

External links 
 

1918 births
2000 deaths
British Army personnel of World War II
Coldstream Guards officers
Conservative Party (UK) MPs for English constituencies
Knights Bachelor\
Ministers in the Macmillan and Douglas-Home governments, 1957–1964
People educated at Radley College
Politicians awarded knighthoods
UK MPs 1959–1964
UK MPs 1964–1966
UK MPs 1966–1970
UK MPs 1970–1974
UK MPs 1974
UK MPs 1974–1979
UK MPs 1979–1983